Ostrogoth is a Belgian heavy metal band, formed in 1980 in Ghent.

The group is influenced by other successful European metal bands such as Scorpions and Accept. After an EP and two albums, Full Moon's Eyes, Ecstasy and Danger and Too Hot, the band went through a major line-up change for 1987's Feelings of Fury, following which the band disbanded.
 
Over these years, they shared the stage with amongst others Def Leppard, Manowar, Vandenberg, Loudness, Uriah Heep and Gary Moore. 2002 saw Ostrogoth reuniting for a string of Belgian shows featuring both Marc 'Red Star' De Brauwer and Peter De Wint on vocals, each representing the material of their time with the band. In 2010, Ostrogoth briefly reunited with singer Marc De Brauwer, who was soon to be replaced by Josey Hindrix. Several years later the band started working on new material and recorded the EP, Last Tribe Standing, which was released in 2015. Another major line-up change happened in 2018.

Members

Current members
 Mario "Grizzly" Pauwels – drums (1980–1988, 2002, 2010–present)
 Josey Hindrix – vocals (2012–present)
 Gerry Verstreken - bass (2018-present)
 Fré Ost - guitars (2018-present)
 Bram Engelen - guitars (2020-present)

Former members
 Marnix "Bronco" van de Kauter – bass (1980–1988, 2002, 2010–2013)
 Jean-Pierre "Pierke" Dekeghel – guitars (1980–1981, died 2014)
 Luc Minne – vocals (1980–1982)
 Hans "Sphinx" van de Kerckhove – guitars (1980–1986, died 1989)
 Rudy "WhiteShark" Vercruysse – guitars (1980–1988, 2002, 2010–2014, died 2015)
 Marc "Red Star" de Brauwer – vocals (1982–1986, 2002, 2010–2011)
 Sylvain Cherotti – bass (1987–1988)
 Junao Martins – guitars (1987–1988, 2002)
 Chris Taerwe –keyboards (1987–1988)
 Peter De Wint – vocals (1987–1988, 2002)
 Pierre Villafranca – bass (1986–1987)
 Geert Annys – guitars (2014-2016)
 Dario Frodo - guitars (2011-2017)
 Stripe - bass (2014-2017)
 Tom Tas - guitars (2016-2017)

Timeline

Discography

Studio albums
 Ecstasy and Danger (1984)
 Too Hot (1985)
 Feelings of Fury (1987)

EP
 Full Moon's Eyes (1983)
 Last Tribe Standing (2015)

References

External links
 

Belgian heavy metal musical groups
Musical groups established in 1980